Eduard Ayangwa Folayang (born November 22, 1983) is a Filipino mixed martial artist and wushu practitioner who fights in ONE Championship, where he is a two-time ONE Lightweight World Champion. He also competed for Universal Reality Combat Championship, where he was the last welterweight champion.

Folayang was a member of Team Lakay Wushu in Baguio from 2007 until he left the gym this March 10, 2023, which has produced numerous Filipino champions in URCC and ONE Championship.

Prior to joining Team Lakay Wushu, Folayang was a high school teacher in the Mountain Province. The Baguio native made his first Martial Combat debut on June 17, 2010, defeating Slovak fighter Egon Racz via guillotine choke early in the first round.

Folayang has won several international Wushu tournaments, including a gold medal at the 2011 Southeast Asian Games which he won with a spinning back kick KO in the final, a silver medal in the 2006 Doha Asian Games, and bronze medals in both the 2005 World Wushu Championship and the 2002 Busan Asian Games.

Biography
Folayang was born in Baguio on November 22, 1983.  His parents are natives of Mountain Province. He endured a very tough childhood with his family living in dire poverty for much of his youth. Folayang even lost five of his siblings due to a lack of access to healthcare.

Folayang started training wushu and boxing when he was 16 years old under the tutelage of head coach Tony Candelaria, who helped him to improve his skills and discipline.

Folayang graduated from the University of the Cordilleras in 2006, and passed his exam to become a teacher. He began teaching English and Physical Education, but six months in, decided to quit to pursue his dreams in martial arts.

After surviving his own impoverished childhood, Folayang now uses his status to promote and help other charities, including raising money for education for under-privileged Filipino children.

Folayang is a Christian.

Mixed martial arts career

URCC/Gorilla Warfare
On June 30, 2007, Folayang made his professional debut in the Universal Reality Combat Championship (URCC), the biggest mixed martial arts promotion in the Philippines. The Baguio native fought undefeated welterweight champion Allan Co and defeated him by TKO in round 1. With the win, Folayang became the new title holder.

After 5 wins, Folayang suffered his first defeat at the hands of Guam's Jon Tuck via knockout in just 8 seconds on November 21, 2009. This was his second bout in the Gorilla Warfare promotion.

Despite having a contract with ONE FC, Folayang was allowed to return to the URCC to fight Brazilian Muay Thai champion Wadson Teixeira at URCC Cebu VII: Dominate on January 13, 2012. He won by submission due to elbows in the first round.

On December 1, 2012, Folayang returned in the promotion facing Lowen Tynanes. Eduard Folayang loss by a doctor stoppage due to a big cut delivered by Tynanes' elbow.

Martial Combat
Folayang entered the Singapore-based promotion Martial Combat in 2010. On June 17, the multi-titled wushu expert took on Slovakian fighter Egon Racz in the MC – Martial Combat 5 event. Folayang won the match via guillotine choke early in the first round.

On July 14, 2010, Folayang fought Mongolian Bao She Ri Gu Leng in a lightweight fight, with the latter's Superfight lightweight title at stake; the event was held at the Resorts World Sentosa in Singapore. The Filipino fighter won by unanimous decision after 5 round, to become the new champion.

On October 16, 2010, Folayang fought South African Muay Thai specialist Vuyisile Colossa at Martial Combat 12. Folayang won a decision after scoring multiple takedowns in the first two rounds even though Colossa dominated the third round.

ONE Championship
He was originally scheduled to make his ONE Championship debut against Muay Thai champion-turned MMA fighter Ole Laursen at ONE FC: Champion vs. Champion at the Singapore Indoor Stadium on September 3, 2011. Laursen, however, suffered a knee injury in training and was replaced by A Sol Kwon, a South Korean on a six fight winning streak. Folayang won the fight via unanimous decision.

A rescheduled bout with Ole Laursen took place on March 31, 2012. In a back-and-forth fight, Folayang lost via a controversial split decision, resulting to the crowd booing Laursen after the decision was announced.

On July 18, 2012, Folayang defeated Felipe Enomoto via unanimous decision at ONE FC: Pride of a Nation in Manila, Philippines. Right after the fight ONE FC President Victor Cui announced that Folayang will earn a shot for the first ever ONE FC lightweight belt on October at ONE FC: Rise of Kings against Zorobabel Moreira. Despite the announcement, Folayang had to pull out of the title fight due to URCC commitments. He was later replaced by former foe Ole Laursen who was again replaced by Kotetsu Boku who eventually became the first ever ONE FC Lightweight Champion. However, One FC officials mentioned that Folayang will retain his no.1 contender status and should face the eventual winner Boku.

On May 31, 2013, Folayang fought UFC and WEC veteran Kamal Shalorus at ONE FC 9: Rise to Power. He lost the fight via unanimous decision.

Coming from a two-fight losing skid, Folayang faced Dutch fighter Vincent Latoel on December 6, 2013, at ONE FC: Moment of Truth. The event took place at the SM Mall of Asia Arena in Pasay, Philippines. For the majority of the fight, Folayang used his takedowns and ground striking offense but was unable to finish his opponent, eventually winning by unanimous decision.

In his next fight, Folayang faced former ONE FC lightweight champion Kotetsu Boku on May 2, 2014, at ONE FC: Rise of Heroes. He won the bout by unanimous decision.

Folayang faced Russian fighter Timofey Nastyukhin on December 5, 2014, at ONE FC 23: Warrior's Way. Despite entering the fight as a favorite, Folayang lost the fight via KO in the first round after being dropped by a flying knee and then finished by Nastyukhin's soccer kicks.

ONE Lightweight Champion
After picking up two consecutive wins in 2016, Folayang faced Shinya Aoki for the ONE Championship Lightweight title at ONE Championship: Defending Honor on November 11, 2016, in Singapore. Folayang won the bout and the title via TKO in the third round.

On April 21, 2017, Folayang successfully defended his title against Ev Ting at ONE 54: Kings of Destiny. On November 10, 2017, Folayang lost the lightweight title at ONE 61: Legends of the World to Martin Nguyen via second-round KO, Nguyen would then vacate the title due to injury.

After losing his title, Folayang picked up a couple of wins against Kharun Atlangeriev and Aziz Pahrudinov in 2018 and was given a chance to reclaim the belt at ONE Championship: Conquest of Champions on November 23, 2018, against Singaporean knockout artist Amir Khan. Folayang recaptured the lightweight title by defeating Khan via unanimous decision.

On March 31, 2019, Folayang lost the lightweight title again in a rematch with Shinya Aoki at ONE Championship: A New Era via technical submission.

Post-title reign
Folayang's next fight was at ONE Championship: Dawn of Heroes on August 2, 2019. He faced former UFC and Bellator lightweight champion Eddie Alvarez. Folayang lost the fight via submission in the first round.

Folayang is now expected to face Amarsanaa Tsogookhuu at ONE Championship: Masters Of Fate on November 8, 2019. After dominating early in the fight with his kicks, an accidental clash of heads in the second round cut Folayang open and rendered him unable to continue. The fight would go to a technical decision and Eduard Folayang won by unanimous decision.

Afterwards, Folayang was originally scheduled to face Ahmed Mujtaba at ONE Championship: Fire & Fury. However, Mujtaba would later be replaced by Pieter Buist. On January 31, 2020, Folayang lost to Buist by split decision.

Folayang faced Antonio Caruso at ONE Championship: Inside the Matrix on October 30, 2020. He lost the fight via unanimous decision.

Folayang was to make a comeback on April 28, 2021, against former UFC middleweight contender Yoshihiro Akiyama at ONE on TNT 4. However, he was rescheduled instead to have a trilogy match against Shinya Aoki after Akiyama pulled out due to suffering an injury during training camp. He lost the bout in the first round via armbar.

Folayang faced Zhang Lipeng at ONE Championship: Battleground 2 on August 13, 2021. He lost the bout via unanimous decision.

Folayang made his ONE Super Series debut against John Wayne Parr under Muay Thai rules at ONE: X on March 26, 2022. He won the bout via unanimous decision.

Folayang faced Edson Marques on December 3, 2022, at ONE on Prime Video 5. He lost the fight via technical knockout in the second round.

Folayang left his longtime training camp in Baguio City on March 10, 2023 due to undisclosed reasons.

Championships and accomplishments

Mixed martial arts
Martial Combat
Martial Combat Superfight Lightweight Championship (One time) 
ONE Championship
 ONE Lightweight World Championship (Two time) vs. Shinya Aoki and Amir Khan
(First reign) One successful title defense  vs. Ev Ting
Fight of the Night (Three times) vs. A Sol Kwon, Ole Laursen and Ev Ting
Most fights in ONE Championship (23) 
Universal Reality Combat Championship
URCC Welterweight Championship (One time)
Three successful title defenses
Other
 #1 Pound for Pound MMA fighter in the Philippines

Wushu
2002 Asian Games – Bronze medal
2005 World Wushu Championships – Bronze medal
2006 Asian Games – Silver medal
2003 SEA Games  – Gold Medal
2005 SEA Games – Gold Medal
2011 SEA Games – Gold Medal

Mixed martial arts record

|-
|Loss
|align=center|22–13
|Edson Marques
|TKO (punch)
|ONE on Prime Video 5
|
|align=center|2
|align=center|2:53
|Pasay, Philippines
|
|-
|Loss
|align=center|22–12
|Zhang Lipeng
|Decision (unanimous)
| ONE Championship: Battleground 2
||
|align=center|3
|align=center|5:00
|Kallang, Singapore
|
|-
|Loss
|align=center|22–11
|Shinya Aoki
|Submission (armbar)
|ONE on TNT 4
|
|align=center|1
|align=center|4:20
|Kallang, Singapore
|
|-
| Loss
| align=center| 22–10
| Antonio Caruso
| Decision (unanimous) 
|ONE Championship: Inside the Matrix
| 
| align=center|3
| align=center|5:00
| Kallang, Singapore
|
|-
| Loss
| align=center| 22–9
| Pieter Buist 
| Decision (split) 
|ONE Championship: Fire & Fury
| 
| align=center|3
| align=center|5:00
| Manila, Philippines
|
|-
| Win
| align=center| 22–8
| Amarsanaa Tsogookhuu 
| Technical Decision (unanimous) 
|ONE Championship: Masters of Fate
| 
| align=center|2
| align=center|2:31
| Manila, Philippines
| 
|-
|-
| Loss
| align=center| 21–8
| Eddie Alvarez
| Submission (rear-naked choke)
|ONE Championship: Dawn of Heroes
| 
| align=center|1
| align=center|2:16
| Manila, Philippines
|
|-
|-
| Loss
| align=center| 21–7
| Shinya Aoki
| Technical Submission (arm-triangle choke)
| ONE Championship: A New Era
| 
| align=center|1
| align=center|2:34
| Tokyo, Japan
| 
|-
|-
| Win
| align=center| 21–6
| Amir Khan
| Decision (unanimous)
| ONE Championship: Conquest of Champions
| 
| align=center|5
| align=center|5:00
| Manila, Philippines
| 
|-
|-
| Win
| align=center| 20–6
| Aziz Pahrudinov
| Decision (unanimous)
| ONE Championship: Reign of Kings
| 
| align=center|3
| align=center|5:00
| Manila, Philippines
|
|-
| Win
| align=center| 19–6
| Kharun Atlangeriev
| Decision (unanimous)
| ONE Championship: Unstoppable Dreams
| 
| align=center|3
| align=center|5:00
| Kallang, Singapore
| 
|-
| Loss
| align=center| 18–6
| Martin Nguyen
| KO (Punch)
| ONE Championship: Legends of the World
| 
| align=center|2
| align=center|2:20
| Manila, Philippines
| 
|-
|-
| Win
| align=center| 18–5
| Ev Ting
| Decision (unanimous)
| ONE Championship: Kings of Destiny
| 
| align=center|5
| align=center|5:00
| Manila, Philippines
| 
|-
| Win
| align=center| 17–5
| Shinya Aoki
| TKO (knees and punches)
| ONE Championship: Defending Honor
| 
| align=center| 3
| align=center| 0:41
| Sentosa, Singapore
| 
|-
| Win
| align=center| 16–5
| Adrian Pang
| Decision (unanimous)
| ONE Championship: Heroes of the World
| 
| align=center| 3
| align=center| 5:00
| Macau, China
| 
|-
| Win
| align=center| 15–5
| Tetsuya Yamada
| Decision (unanimous)
| ONE Championship: Clash of Heroes
| 
| align=center| 3
| align=center| 5:00
| Kuala Lumpur, Malaysia
| 
|-
| Loss
| align=center| 14–5
| Timofey Nastyukhin 
| KO (flying knee and soccer kicks)
| ONE FC: Warrior's Way
| 
| align=center| 1
| align=center| 3:11
| Pasay, Philippines
| 
|-
|  Win
| align=center| 14–4
| Kotetsu Boku
| Decision (unanimous)
| ONE FC: Rise of Heroes
| 
| align=center| 3
| align=center| 5:00
| Pasay, Philippines
| 
|-
| Win
| align=center| 13–4
| Vincent Latoel
| Decision (unanimous)
| ONE FC: Moment of Truth
| 
| align=center| 3
| align=center| 5:00
| Pasay, Philippines
| 
|-
| Loss
| align=center| 12–4
| Kamal Shalorus
| Decision (unanimous)
| ONE FC: Rise to Power
| 
| align=center| 3
| align=center| 5:00
| Pasay, Philippines
| 
|-
| Loss
| align=center| 12–3
| Lowen Tynanes
| TKO (doctor stoppage)
| URCC 22: Dekada
| 
| align=center| 1
| align=center| 6:22
| Manila, Philippines
| 
|-
| Win
| align=center| 12–2
| Felipe Enomoto
| Decision (unanimous)
| ONE FC: Pride of a Nation
| 
| align=center| 3
| align=center| 5:00
| Manila, Philippines
| 
|-
| Loss
| align=center| 11–2
| Ole Laursen
| Decision (split)
| ONE FC: War of the Lions
| 
| align=center| 3
| align=center| 5:00
| Kallang, Singapore
| 
|-
| Win
| align=center| 11–1
| Wadson Teixeira
| Submission (elbows)
| URCC Cebu VII: Dominate
| 
| align=center| 1
| align=center| 0:56
| Cebu City, Philippines
| 
|-
| Win
| align=center| 10–1
| A Sol Kwon
| Decision (unanimous)
| ONE FC 1: Champion vs. Champion
| 
| align=center| 3
| align=center| 5:00
| Kallang, Singapore
|  
|-
| Win
| align=center| 9–1
| Vuyisile Colossa
| Decision (unanimous)
| Martial Combat 12
| 
| align=center| 3
| align=center| 5:00
| Sentosa, Singapore
| 
|-
| Win
| align=center| 8–1
| Bao She Ri Gu Leng
| Decision (unanimous)
| Martial Combat 5
| 
| align=center| 5
| align=center| 5:00
| Sentosa, Singapore
| 
|-
| Win
| align=center| 7–1
| Egon Racz
| Submission (guillotine choke)
| Martial Combat 4
| 
| align=center| 1
| align=center| 4:40
| Sentosa, Singapore
| 
|-
| Win
| align=center| 6–1
| Doo Jae Jung
| TKO (punches)
| URCC 16: Reckoning
| 
| align=center| 1
| align=center| 3:15
| Makati, Philippines
| 
|-
| Loss
| align=center| 5–1
| Jon Tuck
| KO (punch)
| Gorilla Warfare 3: Confrontation
| 
| align=center| 1
| align=center| 0:08
| Saipan, Northern Mariana Islands
| 
|-
| Win
| align=center| 5–0
| A.J. Aguon
| Decision (unanimous)
| URCC 14: Aggression
| 
| align=center| 2
| align=center| 10:00
| Makati, Philippines
| 
|-
| Win
| align=center| 4–0
| Jerome Norita
| TKO (punches)
| Gorilla Warfare 2: Battle Ready
| 
| align=center| 1
| align=center| 0:52
| Saipan, Northern Mariana Islands
| 
|-
| Win
| align=center| 3–0
| Jerry Legaspi
| TKO (strikes)
| URCC 13: Indestructible
| 
| align=center| 1
| align=center| 0:15
| Makati, Philippines
| 
|-
| Win
| align=center| 2–0
| Caloy Baduria
| TKO (punches)
| URCC 12: Supremacy
| 
| align=center| 1
| align=center| 3:41
| Makati, Philippines
| 
|-
| Win
| align=center| 1–0
| Allan Co
| TKO (punches)
| URCC 10
| 
| align=center| 1
| align=center| 7:24
| Taguig, Philippines
|

Muay Thai record

|- style="background:#cfc;"
|  2022-03-26 || Win || align="left" | John Wayne Parr || ONE: X || Kallang, Singapore || Decision (unanimous) || 3 || 3:00
|}

See also
List of current ONE fighters

References

External links
 
 URCC Profile
 Eduard Folayang at ONE Championship

1984 births
Living people
Filipino male mixed martial artists
Welterweight mixed martial artists
Filipino wushu practitioners
Filipino sanshou practitioners
Filipino Muay Thai practitioners
Asian Games medalists in wushu
Wushu practitioners at the 2010 Asian Games
Wushu practitioners at the 2006 Asian Games
Wushu practitioners at the 2002 Asian Games
Filipino male boxers
Sportspeople from Baguio
Asian Games silver medalists for the Philippines
Asian Games bronze medalists for the Philippines
Filipino schoolteachers
Medalists at the 2002 Asian Games
Medalists at the 2006 Asian Games
21st-century Filipino educators
Southeast Asian Games gold medalists for the Philippines
Southeast Asian Games competitors for the Philippines
Southeast Asian Games medalists in wushu
Competitors at the 2003 Southeast Asian Games
Competitors at the 2005 Southeast Asian Games
Competitors at the 2011 Southeast Asian Games
University of the Cordilleras alumni
Mixed martial artists utilizing sanshou
Mixed martial artists utilizing suntukan
Mixed martial artists utilizing Muay Thai
Mixed martial artists utilizing Yaw-Yan
ONE Championship champions